The NCAA Division I Women's Golf Championship, played in the month of May, is the annual competition in women's collegiate golf for individuals and teams from universities in Division I. Golf was one of twelve women's sports added to the NCAA championship program for the 1981-82 school year. From its inception through 2014, it was a stroke play team competition with an additional individual award. Beginning in 2015, after 72 holes of stroke play, the top eight teams play in single-elimination match play to determine the team champion.

Many individual winners have gone on to have successful careers on the LPGA Tour, including 1991 champion Annika Sörenstam and 1999 champion Grace Park.

The Division I competition started in 1982. A combined Division II and Division III championship was held from 1996 to 1999, splitting into separate championships starting in 2000.

Results

Stroke play (1982–2014)

Stroke and match play (2015–present)

Notes 
 Team championship decided by playoff.
 Individual championship decided by playoff.
 Tulsa's team (1,175) and individual (Melissa McNamara, 287) championships from 1988 were vacated by the NCAA.
 The fourth round of the 1999 championship was cancelled due to rain.
 NCAA record – Lowest aggregate score.
 NCAA record – Most strokes under par.

Appearances
This list consists of the top 25 women's college golf teams in terms of appearances in the NCAA Division I Women's Championship.

as of 2019

Team titles

Winners of both NCAA and U.S. Amateur
The following women have won both the NCAA individual championship and the U.S. Women's Amateur. Only Vicki Goetze (1992) managed the feat in the same year.

See also
AIAW Intercollegiate Women's Golf Champions
NAIA Women's Golf Championship
National Golf Coaches Association

References

External links
NCAA women's golf
NCAA Women's Golf History

Golf, women
Golf
College golf in the United States
Team golf tournaments
Amateur golf tournaments in the United States
Women's golf tournaments in the United States
Golf
Golf